is a public university in Yamaguchi, Yamaguchi, Japan. Its predecessor was founded in 1941, and it was chartered as a university in 1975. In 1996 it became a coeducational institution.

Faculty & Department 

 Faculty of Intercultural Studies
 InterCultural Studies
 Culture and Creative Arts
 Faculty of Social Welfare
 Faculty of Nursing and Human Nutrition
 Nursing
 Human Nutrition
 Graduate School of Intercultural Studies
 Graduate School of Health and Welfare
 Division of Midwifery

References

External links
 Official website 
 Official website

Educational institutions established in 1941
Public universities in Japan
Universities and colleges in Yamaguchi Prefecture
1941 establishments in Japan